Walter Martin Corey (May 9, 1938 – October 23, 2022) was an American professional football player and coach. He played as a linebacker for seven seasons in the American Football League (AFL) before coaching in the National Football League (NFL) for 28 seasons.

Corey played college football for the University of Miami, and then played for the Dallas Texans / Kansas City Chiefs of the AFL from 1960 to 1966. He was an AFL All-Star in 1963 and a member of the AFL champions in 1962 and 1966. Corey then served as head coach of the Omaha Mustangs, a defensive coach at the collegiate level for the University of Miami and Utah State University, for the Chiefs, Cleveland Browns, Buffalo Bills, and New Orleans Saints of the NFL, as well as the Memphis Maniax of the XFL.

Early life
Corey, the youngest of 16 children, was born in Latrobe, Pennsylvania, on May 9, 1938.  He attended Derry Township High School in nearby Cooperstown. He then studied at the University of Miami, where he played linebacker for the Miami Hurricanes.  Undrafted in the 1960 NFL Draft, Corey signed as a rookie free agent with the Dallas Texans of the American Football League (AFL).

Playing career
Corey signed with the Dallas Texans (now known as the Kansas City Chiefs) as undrafted free agent. With the team, he was an AFL All-Star for the 1963 season. In the 1966 season, the Chiefs appeared in Super Bowl I. Corey announced his retirement after the 1966 season to begin a coaching career.

Coaching career
Corey was hired as the head coach with the Omaha Mustangs of the Professional Football League of America. Before the 1967 season, he was hired to the defensive coaching staff for Utah State University. In 1968, he represented Utah State as a defensive backs coach at the North–South Shrine Game. Corey was hired to be the Miami Hurricanes' defensive coordinator in 1970 and to coach the offensive backfield in 1971.

In 1971, the Kansas City Chiefs hired Corey as a defensive coach. After the 1974 season, the Cleveland Browns hired Corey as their linebacker and strength coach. After three seasons with Cleveland, Corey returned to the Chiefs as their linebacker coach for the 1978 season. After coaching Kansas City's defensive line for two years, he became their defensive backs coach. In 1983, new Chiefs head coach John Mackovic named Corey his first hire for his coaching staff, assigning him to coach the defensive line. In 1986, Mackovic promoted Corey to defensive coordinator.

Corey followed former Chiefs head coach Marv Levy to the Buffalo Bills in 1987. He coached there until the 1994 season, when the Bills finished a disappointing 7–9, and Corey was fired. Corey was Buffalo's defensive coordinator for Buffalo's four consecutive AFC Championship teams from 1990 to 1993. He was also the defensive line coach for the New Orleans Saints under head coach Mike Ditka, from 1997 to 1999. He was the defensive coordinator and linebackers coach of the Memphis Maniax of the XFL in 2001, its only season.

Personal life
Corey and his wife, Jane, had two children. Corey died on October 23, 2022, at age 84.

See also
 List of American Football League players

References

1938 births
2022 deaths
American Football League All-Star players
American Football League players
American football linebackers
Buffalo Bills coaches
Dallas Texans (AFL) players
Kansas City Chiefs players
Kansas City Chiefs coaches
New Orleans Saints coaches
Miami Hurricanes football players
Memphis Maniax coaches
National Football League defensive coordinators
People from Latrobe, Pennsylvania
Players of American football from Pennsylvania
Sportspeople from the Pittsburgh metropolitan area